Almost Grown may refer to:

Almost Grown (Grey's Anatomy), an episode of the American medical drama Grey's Anatomy
Almost Grown (TV series), an American television series
"Almost Grown" (song), a 1959 song by Chuck Berry
Almost Grown, a 1963 album by The Animals